Gisella Delle Grazie (born 1 June 1868; fl. 1894–95) was an Italian composer born in Trieste. Delle Grazie composed two operas, Atala (I Pellirossa), premiered at the Teatro Balbo in Turin in 1894, and La trecciaiuola di Firenze, premiered at the Teatro Filodrammatico in Trieste in 1895.

References

Italian women classical composers
Italian opera composers
1868 births
Year of death unknown
Women opera composers
Italian music educators
Italian classical composers
Musicians from Trieste
19th-century classical composers
19th-century Italian composers
19th-century Italian women
Women music educators
19th-century women composers